Ivan Dodig and Mate Pavić were the defending champions, but Pavić chose not to participate this year. Dodig played alongside Filip Polášek, but lost in the semifinals to Jonathan Erlich and Fabrice Martin.

Nikola Čačić and Dušan Lajović won the title, defeating Erlich and Martin in the final, 7–6(11–9), 3–6, [10–3].

Seeds

Draw

Draw

References
 Main Draw

Chengdu Open - Doubles
2019 Doubles
2019 in Chinese tennis